Heliamphora folliculata (Latin: folliculatus = having follicles) is a species of Marsh Pitcher Plant endemic to the Aparaman group of tepuis in Venezuela. It grows on all four mountains: Aparaman Tepui, Murosipan Tepui, Tereke Tepui and Kamakeiwaran Tepui.

The nectar spoon of this species, which bears giant extrafloral nectaries within its internal chamber, may have evolved to prevent rain from washing away the energetically costly nectar produced by the plant.

References

Further reading

 Carow, T., A. Wistuba & P. Harbarth (March 2005). Heliamphora sarracenioides, a new species of Heliamphora (Sarraceniaceae) from Venezuela. Carnivorous Plant Newsletter 34(1): 4–6.
 McPherson, S. (2007). Pitcher Plants of the Americas. The McDonald & Woodward Publishing Company, Blacksburg, Virginia. 
 Nerz, J. (December 2004). Heliamphora elongata (Sarraceniaceae), a new species from Ilu-Tepui. Carnivorous Plant Newsletter 33(4): 111–116.
 Nerz, J. & A. Wistuba (June 2006). Heliamphora exappendiculata, a clearly distinct species with unique characteristics. Carnivorous Plant Newsletter 35(2): 43–51.

folliculata
Flora of Venezuela
Flora of the Tepuis